The Wade Archeological Site is a prehistoric archaeological site located at the Staunton River Battlefield State Park in Randolph, Charlotte County, Virginia.  It is a Saponi Native American village site from the Late Woodland Period, 270 meters by 70 meters, dating to A.D. 1000 to 1450.

It was listed on the National Register of Historic Places in 2003.

References

Archaeological sites on the National Register of Historic Places in Virginia
Charlotte County, Virginia
National Register of Historic Places in Charlotte County, Virginia